This is the list of fictional and non-fictional characters who appeared in The 39 Clues franchise. They may appear in The 39 Clues books and audiobooks, cards, or the series' official website.

Introduced in The Clue Hunt

Clue Hunters

Amy Cahill 
Amy Cahill (from Boston, Massachusetts) is a fourteen-year-old girl. She has jade eyes and red hair. An avid reader, Amy is fascinated with history and museums, showing herself to be intelligent and analytical. She is also agoraphobic and pyrophobic, the latter coming from haunting memories of the fire that killed her parents when she was seven. She is the protagonist of the franchise.

It was Amy who first suggested that she and Dan join The Clue Hunt. She realized exactly how real their situation was when the Starling Triplets were injured in the Franklin Institute bombing. In Seoul, she trusted Ian Kabra, who betrayed her and left her for dead in a cave. In Moscow, she and Dan traveled alone, finding an ally in high-ranking Lucian NRR. In Australia, she declined an alliance with the Kabras and was almost fed to the sharks as a result. She also realized it was Isabel Kabra who started the fire that killed her parents. In Beijing, she got in a fight with Dan over the true nature of her parents, resulting in them getting separated. On Mount Everest, she saved Ian's life but sacrificed the Janus serum in the process. In Kingston, the death of Lester reminded her again of how serious the Clue Hunt was and how important it was that she and Dan won. In Into the Gauntlet, after defeating Isabel, she convinced all the Cahills to write down their clues then united the family. She inherited leadership from Grace.

Following the Clue Hunt, Fiske Cahill and Nellie Gomez became Amy and Dan's legal guardians, and the four rebuilt Grace's mansion. Sinead Starling came to live with them, making various tech upgrades. Amy acquired a satellite, The Gideon, and linked it to a command center that linked Cahills across the globe. Amy took various lessons in self-defense and martial arts and began working out regularly. She attempted to reconnect with Ian Kabra but failed. She and Dan went on a small mission in Switzerland, where they encountered the Wyoming Twins and acquired Gideon's Ring. She had it made into a watch, which she wore. She then began dating Evan Tolliver.

She and Dan were attacked on their school bus at 8:42 AM EST, then received a text from Vesper 1. They immediately left, stealing various objects for Vesper 1 such as the painting Medusa. In Shatterproof, Amy, believing Ian was the traitor, confronted him. In Trust No One, she learned the truth about Sinead and confronted her. Amy, Dan, Atticus, and Jake traveled by train to the Rocky Mountains, where Amy was saved by Sinead. She freed the hostages but lost Evan in a fight against the Vespers. After Isabel destroyed the Doomsday Device, Amy was left unconscious by the explosion. She attempted to attend Evan's wake but was turned away at the door by his parents.

During William McIntyre's funeral, Amy was attacked and thrown into an open grave. She escaped, discovering journalists and paparazzi were following her. The government seized the command center, while she and Dan went to confront J. Rutherford Pierce. She, Dan, and Nellie traveled to Ireland, where she discovered Olivia Cahill's journal and the antidote for the 39 clues. With the help of allies, she led the Cahills to find various ingredients to the antidote. A fight with Jake Rosenbloom led her to journey to the Svalbard Global Seed Vault, where she almost froze to death but was saved by Cara Pierce. In Guatemala, Amy took a dose of the pure serum to save Dan. She began experiencing the negative side effects, giving Dan temporary power because she did not trust her judgment. In Cambodia, she was the most hesitant to trust Cara. At the clam bake, she flew the crop duster with the antidote, but lost consciousnesses and crashed the plane into the ocean. After arriving at Pierce Landing, Amy typed the passcode to shut off Pierce's nukes. She resigned as leader of the Cahills, giving power to Ian Kabra. She and Dan returned Olivia's journal, then took up traveling.

Following Nathaniel's takeover, Amy and Dan were recruited from Mont Blanc. Despite Ian being the leader, Amy was frequently looked to for leadership. She journeyed on the second Titanic, getting trapped in Antarctica by Alec Spasky. She was locked in a closet on an airship along with Dan and Hamilton Holt. Following the events in Mission Hurricane, Ian gave Amy her leadership position back. She traveled with Jonah Wizard and Hamilton Holt to Shanghai, where she was captured by Alec Spasky. He faked killing her, then allied with her. He brought her to The Hive, where she discovered Nathaniel's bees. Following Nathaniel's defeat, Amy decided Cahill leadership would transition to a new Cahill every four years. She appointed Dan the current leader.

She was willing to speak with Sinead and consider forgiving her and traveled with Dan to Havana. They found Sinead, escaping the city on a small motorboat and taking refuge at the abandoned Ekat stronghold in the Bermuda Triangle. There, Sinead made an antidote to the dancing virus, and Amy administered it to an infected Ian Kabra.

Family: Hope Cahill (mother, deceased), Arthur Trent (father, deceased), Dan Cahill (brother), Grace Cahill (grandmother, deceased), Fiske Cahill (great-uncle, legal guardian), Nellie Gomez (au pair, legal guardian)

Dan Cahill 
Dan Cahill (from Boston, Massachusetts) is an eleven-year-old boy. He has jade eyes and dark blonde hair.  He's physically active, has broken bones multiple times, is good with numbers and puzzles, and has a photographic memory. He is slightly claustrophobic as he has asthma and has frequent attacks in tight, dusty spaces. His official card is No. 2.

Despite wanting the million dollars, Dan was more than willing to embark on the Clue Hunt for Grace. He was tied up by Ian in Paris and lost the Lucian serum. In Moscow, he and Amy left Nellie alone, discovering Lucian officer NRR was helping them find the Amber Room and their fifth clue. In Beijing, a fight with Amy caused them to separate, and he went on his own adventure with Jonah Wizard. This led to him getting trapped with the terracotta soldiers and an assassin actively trying to kill him. He reunited with Amy and considered quitting the Clue Hunt after Lester's death. He discovered the clue on Shakespeare's Tomb. On Cahill Island, he went up with Eisenhower and Hamilton Holt, discovered the elevator, and went back down to get the others. He saw and memorized the recipe for the serum.

Following the Clue Hunt, Nellie Gomez and Fiske Cahill became his legal guardians. At Amy's command, he engaged in training, both physical and mental, to prepare for any future missions or threat he's have to deal with. He became friends with Atticus Rosenbloom, though their communication was strictly virtual. He also went on a small mission in Switzerland, where he first encountered the Vespers.

Along with Amy, he was attacked at 8:42 AM EST. In Rome, he found and stole an original copy of  Il Milione, despite Atticus' pleas of letting it be sent to a museum for study. After explaining to the Rosenbloom brothers the Vesper's threats, the four become allies, traveling the world and stealing objects for Vesper One. After witnessing Nellie getting shot, he secretly began collecting the 39 clues. In Trust No One, he met with Cahill scientists Sammy Mourad to make the serum. In Day of Doom, he tried to take the serum, but Amy confessed to switching it out with water. Unknown to her, he had a second dose, which he saved for later. Between Cahills vs Vespers and Unstoppable, J. Rutherford Pierce stole Sammy's lab research that existed because of Dan. In Countdown, when Dan was in danger of falling to his death, Amy took the serum to save him.

In Athens, Dan unintentionally broke two skydiving world records while escaping from one of the traitors. He experienced firsthand the tidal wave intended to recreate Hurricane Katrina in Amsterdam, as he was on a small boat in the water. In Mission Atomic, he was captured by Nathaniel and brought to The Hive, where he saw the killer bees. In Outbreak, he was adamantly against forgiving Sinead but agreed to venture to Havana with Amy. Once Dan had confirmation that Sinead's antidote worked, he injected himself with the virus to keep enemies away from the Cahills.

Family: Hope Cahill (mother, deceased), Arthur Trent (father, deceased), Amy Cahill (sister), Grace Cahill (grandmother, deceased), Fiske Cahill (great-uncle, legal guardian), Nellie Gomez (au pair, legal guardian)

Nellie Gomez 
Nellie Gomez, from Massachusetts, serves as Amy and Dan's au pair and adult supervisor for their international travels. Nellie listents to music from her i-Pod most of the time. A Bob Marley fan, she describes herself as "reggae and punk fusion". While she is not a Cahill, she was given honorary Madrigal status.

Family:

Ian Kabra 
Ian Kabra (from London, United Kingdom), is a wealthy fourteen-year-old boy. He has cinnamon-complexion skin and amber eyes.  He's interested in aviation, and grew up attending prestigious boarding schools. He's excellent at math. He has feelings for Amy Cahill, despite the disapproval of his mother, Isabel. His card is No. 178.

Family: Isabel Kabra (mother), Vikram Kabra (father), Natalie Kabra (younger sister)

Natalie Kabra 
Natalie Kabra (from London, United Kingdom) is the wealthy eleven year-old girl. She enjoys shopping and fashion. Like her brother Ian, she has cinnamon skin and amber eyes. She carries a poison dart gun for protection. Her card is No. 112.

Family: Isabel Kabra (mother), Vikram Kabra (father), Ian Kabra (older brother)

Eisenhower Holt 
Eisenhower Holt (from Milwaukee, Wisconsin) is a former West Point student who was expelled when Arthur Trent, his roommate, accused him of bringing home a firearm. He then failed to pass training for the FBI, and currently works as a security guard. He was present during the deaths of Hope Cahill and Arthur Trent, where he attempted to put out the fire using the neighbor's garden hose. He is a Tomas. His card is No. 145. 

Family: Mary-Todd Holt (wife), Hamilton Holt (son), Madison Holt (daughter), Reagan Holt (daughter)

Hamilton Holt 
Hamilton Holt (from Milwaukee, Wisconsin) is the sixteen-year-old son of Eisenhower and Mary-Todd Holt. A member of his school's football team and a master of parkour, he is also good with computers. He is considered a school bully. During the clue hunt, he defended Amy and Dan. He's a Tomas. His card is No. 90.

Family: Eisenhower Holt (father), Mary-Todd Holt (mother), Reagan Holt (younger sister), Madison Holt (younger sister)

Reagan Holt 
Reagan Holt (from Milwaukee, Wisconsin) is the eleven-year-old daughter of Eisenhower and Mary-Todd Holt and a twin. Her interests are kickboxing, ballet, and triathlon.  She's the most compassionate member of the family. She's a Tomas. Her card is No. 123.

Family: Eisenhower Holt (father), Mary-Todd Holt (mother), Hamilton Holt (older brother), Madison Holt (twin sister)

Madison Holt 
Madison Holt (from Milwaukee, Wisconsin) is the eleven-year-old daughter of Eisenhower and Mary-Todd Holt and a twin. She plays ice hockey. She's a Tomas. Her card is No. 187.

Family: Eisenhower Holt (father), Mary-Todd Holt (mother), Hamilton Holt (older brother), Reagan Holt (twin sister)

Mary-Todd Holt 
Mary-Todd Holt (from Daytona Beach, Florida) is the wife of Eisenhower Holt. She's a Tomas. Her card is No. 238.

Family: Eisenhower Holt (husband), Hamilton Holt (son), Madison Holt (daughter), Reagan Holt (daughter)

Arnold 
Arnold is the Holt family pit bull. He accompanies the family on the clue hunt. His cards are No. 403, No. 412, No. 414, and No. 418.

Alistair Oh
Alistair Oh (from Seoul, South Korea) is one of the wittiest clue hunters in the quest. He always holds his diamond-tipped cane with him while traveling. Alistair is also the inventor of microwavable burritos. Although he lost much of his money on bad investments, he managed to live by himself since the death of his father Gordon. Alistair makes alliances with other teams only to then doublecross them, and sometimes leaving them to die. Also, he was one of the witnesses of Hope Cahill's and Arthur Trent's deaths. He turned Isabel Kabra over to the police, putting her in prison until her death. He is an Ekat, wherein his uncle Bae is the branch leader. His official card is No. 34. He dies of a heart attack in Trust No One, the Vespers capture him and Ted in Tel-Aviv.

Family: Gordon Oh (father, deceased), Bae Oh (uncle), James Cahill (uncle)

The Starling Triplets
Ned, Ted, and Sinead Starling (all from Oak Bluffs, Massachusetts) are the most surprising team in the quest. Ned, Ted, and Sinead are commonly seen in their preppy clothes. In the first book, while at the Franklin Institute, an explosion occurs that severely hurts them, and put them out of the clue hunt for almost a month. After recovery, they were grounded by their parents thus, they cannot continue on their quest. However, they found medical procedures to speed up healing for their injuries, but still leaving Ned with recurring and painful headaches and Ted almost completely blind. They have read up on the hunt during their hospital days to keep up with the other teams, and even stole one of Bae Oh's Clues. Sinead has become very protective of her brothers since their incident and made it her goal to use the master serum to cure them. They are all Ekats. In the 4th book of the second series, it was revealed that Sinead was Vesper 3, the Mole, but later in Day of Doom she returns to the Cahills after realizing that she harmed her own family and that Vesper One will kill all the hostages, including Ted. They do not have any respective cards, although Sinead Starling appears in the card 303: magnifying glass and the card 284: Vesper Mole.

Irina Spasky
Irina Nikolaievna Spaskaya (from St. Petersburg, Russia) is the most mysterious person in the quest. She is forty-seven years old, and always wears her KGB uniform, which she used during the Cold War. She carries fingernail injectors filled with poison for protection. Her left eye commonly twitches when she's nervous. Irina's husband, Nikilovana Spasky,  was killed by Isabel Kabra as he was next in line for Lucian leadership. Irina also had a son named Nikolai who died of scarlet fever she was on a mission. In the sixth book, Irina is incinerated while saving Amy Cahill, Dan Cahill, and Alistair Oh from Alistair's burning apartment. In the last book, it was revealed that she gave Alistair a short-term memory loss pill before her death, which helps them make sure Isabel Kabra wouldn't remember any clues of how to make the Master Serum. She is a Lucian. Her official cards are No. 74 and No. 107.

Family: Nikilovana Spasky (husband, deceased), Nikolai Spasky (son, deceased)

Jonah and Broderick Wizard 
Jonah (from Los Angeles, California) and Broderick Wizard (from Dallas, Texas) are the most famous team in the quest. Jonah is fifteen years old. Jonah is an award-winning musician, artist, writer, producer, and entrepreneur, with his music on the top ten in almost every country; with his father Broderick serving as his personal manager. Jonah always wear blings around his neck, while Broderick always brings his BlackBerry with him. Cora Wizard, Broderick's wife, tried to train Jonah to become a killer. Also in the eighth book, Jonah decided to quit the quest, only to return in the last book, where he was revealed to be a fan of William Shakespeare. Jonah is a Janus, wherein Cora serves as one of the branch leaders. Although Broderick is not a Cahill, he knows three more Clues than his family suspect he knows. Jonah's official card is No. 80, while Broderick is No. 153.

Family (Jonah): Broderick Wizard (father), Cora Wizard (mother), Phoenix Wizard (young cousin), Leila Wizard (aunt)

Family (Broderick): Cora Wizard (wife), Jonah Wizard (son), Phoenix Wizard (nephew)

Former and Current Branch Leaders

Grace Cahill
Grace Cahill (from Attleboro, Massachusetts) was the matriarch of the Cahill family. She died when she was seventy-nine years old. She had a jade necklace that she always wore until her death. She was a professional pilot, and had a private airplane that she flew around the world with, which she named The Flying Lemur. During her life, she had been lonely due to the deaths of her relatives (her ex-husband Nathaniel Hartford, her daughter Hope Cahill, and her son-in-law Arthur Trent). Even though, she managed to keep all the Clues safe in her hands until her death just after she altered her will and thus started the quest. Her official cards are No. 59, No. 133, and No. 197.

Saladin
Saladin (from Attleboro, Massachusetts) is the Egyptian Mau of Grace Cahill. He is very fond of red snappers. He is named after Saladin, whose full name was Salah ad-Din Yusuf ibn Ayyub, and who was the Muslim prince who led the Muslims during the Crusades. Since the death of Grace, Saladin was missing until Amy and Dan Cahill found him, and has joined them in the hunt since then. He is a Madrigal. His cards are No. 33, #140, and No. 202.

Isabel Kabra
Isabel Kabra is the main antagonist of the first series and the mother of Ian and Natalie. She was the one who murdered Amy and Dan's parents, and she eventually murdered Irina Spasky as well. She created the Master Serum as part of an attempt to become the most powerful human on Earth, but the vial containing it smashed. She was knocked out, and later taken into police custody. To get out of prison, she created a service called AidsWorksWonders, but it is revealed later that she simply pays people to claim that her organization helped them. In Day of Doom, It is revealed that she is Vesper two, the shield. It's also revealed that she was faking texts sent by Arthur Trent to Dan, in order to make Dan give her information about the Master Serum. At the end of Day of Doom, she sees the dead body of her daughter, Natalie, and assuming that Vesper One killed her, she swears to take revenge on him. She drinks the Master Serum which stole from Dan, and she storms into the room where Cahills and Vespers are fighting killing every Vesper in her way. She then attacks Vesper One, and meanwhile, she prevents Amy and Dan to do so. She eventually destroys The Machina Fini Mundi and she causes a massive explosion which kills both her and Vesper One.

Vikram Kabra
Vikram Kabra (from London, United Kingdom) was the leader of the Lucians, which he shared with his wife Isabel Kabra. He was an art dealer who served as Ian and Natalie Kabra's father. Later on, it was revealed that, only a few hours after Isabel's arrest, he chartered a plane to Brazil to avoid questioning. In Doublecross, Vikram is revealed to be working with Hartford. In Mission Atomic, Vikram escapes after Ian and Cara crash through the greenhouse roof.  His card is No. 232.

Bae Oh
Bae Oh (from Seoul, South Korea) was the leader of the Ekats. He is eighty-seven years old. He is commonly holding his silver-tipped cane. His twin brother, Gordon, was murdered by a killer he hired sixty years ago. He is Alistair Oh's uncle. When Alistair returned from the Madrigal gauntlet, he tricked Bae into confessing that he killed Gordon Oh and Bae was subsequently arrested for murder, arms dealing, assault, and battery. He was tortured to death. His card is No. 168.

Ivan Kleister
Ivan Kleister (from Oslo, Norway) is the leader of the Tomas. He is a champion skier. He is frequently competing with Eisenhower Holt for the branch leadership, even though he already has the position. His card is No. 188.

Cora Wizard
Cora Wizard (from Los Angeles, California) is one of the leaders of the Janus.  She is the youngest person to receive a Nobel Prize in Literature. She trains her son Jonah to become a killer. Her card is No. 152.

Spencer Gray
Spencer Langendoen, also known by his professional name Spencer Gray (from New York City), was one of the leaders of the Janus. He does not have a card. When he would not step down, Cora Wizard leaked fake documents about him and he stepped down in disgrace.

Halima Amadi
Halima Amadi (from New York City) was one of the leaders of the Janus. She does not have a card. She was bribed by Cora Wizard to step down from her post as leader.

Other Cahill Characters

Hope Cahill
Hope Cahill (from Attleboro, Massachusetts) is the daughter of Grace Cahill. She is Amy and Dan Cahill's mother and was an archaeologist. She met Arthur Trent when she was in Istanbul, Turkey, and later married him. She perished in her burning house with Arthur. The fire was started by Isabel Kabra. She is a Madrigal. Her card is No. 247.

Fiske Cahill
Fiske Green-Cahill (AKA the Man in Black or the Man in Gray) (from Attleboro, Massachusetts) is the brother of Grace Cahill. An artist, Fiske was last seen leaving his painting studio before his disappearance forty-six years ago. Today, he is now disguising himself as an unknown assailant termed the Man in Black due to his oily-black suit that hides his entire body. He has been spying on the other teams since then. In the ninth book, he is shortly known as the Man in Gray, only to reveal his true identity to Amy and Dan Cahill later on. In the last book, he tells Amy and Dan about the Vespers, and later on adopts Amy and Dan. He is a Madrigal. His official card is No. 198 for his true identity, No. 203 for his alter ego Man in Black, and No. 208 for his other identity Man in Gray.

Beatrice Cahill
Beatrice Green-Cahill (from Attleboro, Massachusetts) is the sister of Grace Cahill. She is the mean, arrogant daughter of James Cahill who accepted the responsibility of taking care of Amy and Dan Cahill. She is not involved in the hunt, since she took the million dollars instead. She knows how it affected the lives of their family. She sent a private investigator after Amy and Dan after they joined the hunt, but after long efforts, stopped on finding them. She has been divorced thrice to, namely: Stephano Breglio, Jean-Luc Benoit, and Sergei Baskov. She is an inactive Madrigal. She does not have a card.

James Cahill
James St. James Cahill (from Attleboro, Massachusetts) is the father of Grace Cahill. He is a Madrigal and the half-brother of Gordon Oh. He has a card with 10 death heads. His brother is Jasminite Cahill

Edith Green
Edith Cahill née Schneider-Green (from Attleboro, Massachusetts) is the mother of Grace Cahill. She is a Madrigal. She died giving birth to Fiske Cahill. She does not have a card.

Henry Cahill
Henry Cahill (from Attleboro, Massachusetts) is the paternal grandfather of Grace Cahill. He was married to Flora Cahill St. James but had a child with Hae-In Oh . He is a Madrigal. He does not have a card.

Flora Cahill St. James
Flora Cahill née Cahill-St. James (from Attleboro, Massachusetts) is the paternal grandmother of Grace Cahill. She was married to Henry Cahill. She is a Madrigal. She does not have a card.

Nataliya Ruslanova Radova
Nataliya Ruslanova Radova, more commonly known as NRR, (from Volgograd, Russia) is the daughter of Grand Duchess Anastasia Nikolaevna of Russia and Ruslan Radova, the former branch leader of the Lucians. She suffers from hemophilia (a continuation of the Royal Haemophilia Line), and owns the ring of Czar Nikolai I of Russia. It is revealed in the Black Book of Buried Secrets that she was a Lucian double agent. She does not have a card.

Nikolai Spasky
Nikolai Spaskaya (lt. Nikolai Spasky) (from St. Petersburg, Russia) is the son of Irina and Nikivlona Spasky. His father died five months after he was born. It is said that his mother never talked about his father much, and even when he asked about him, she replied You'll learn later. Sadly he never did. During age eight, Nikolai had a terrible disease which made his body numb. Irina never left his side, until Isabel Kabra assigned her to a mission in Helsinki. While on espionage, Irina had no contacts to the doctor, who had already confirmed Nikolai's death. He is a Lucian. He does not have a card.

Robert Bardsley
Robert Bardsley (from Pretoria, South Africa) is a music professor. He is a friend of Winifred Thembeka. He was a member of the Tomas until he discovered the true intentions of the branch. It is revealed that he joined the Madrigals later. He does not have a card.

Uncle Jose
Jose Correa (from Rio de Janeiro, Brazil) is one of Grace Cahill's long-distance cousins, referred by Amy and Dan Cahill as "Uncle Jose". He is one of those chosen by Grace to participate in the hunt, but took the million dollars.

Cousin Ingrid
Ingrid Martinson (from Oslo, Norway) is one of Grace Cahill's long distance nieces, referred by Amy and Dan Cahill as "Cousin Ingrid". She is one of those chosen by Grace to participate in the hunt, but took the million dollars.

Hae-In Oh
Hae-In Oh (from Seoul, South Korea) is the mother of Gordon Oh and grandmother of Alistair Oh. She is an Ekat. She was married to Hatta Oh, but had a son with Henry Cahill.

Hatta Oh
Hatta Oh (from Seoul, South Korea) is the husband of Hae-In Oh.

Gordon Oh
Gordon Oh (from Seoul, South Korea) is the twin of Bae Oh, and the half-uncle of Grace Cahill. He is also the father of Alistair Oh. He was murdered by Bae sixty years ago. He is an Ekat. His official card is No. 227.

Lin Kim
Lin Oh née Kim (from Seoul, South Korea) is Gordon Oh's wife and Alistair Oh's mother. She is an Ekat. She does not have a card.

Non-Cahill Characters

Arthur Trent
Arthur Josiah Trent (from Attleboro, Massachusetts) was the husband of Hope Cahill. He is Amy and Dan Cahill's father who is a nonlinear dynamics and quantum field theory professor. He is a West Point drop-out. He was born into a family with close ties to the Vespers, but never knew exactly what they were. After joining the Vespers in college, thinking they were a fraternity He had been sent to Turkey to find Hope and make her fall in love with him. However, when Arthur actually met his beautiful target, something happened. He was enchanted by her intelligence, her kindness, and the way her nose twitched when she laughed. He then learned some terrifying information about the Vespers. He realized that he needed to cut his ties to the organization, although the act would put him in danger for the rest of his life. Before he proposed, Arthur told Hope the truth about his background, but Hope already knew. William McIntyre's spies had been following him for months. He was believed to have perished in his burning house with Hope when he was forty-two years old, but in the book A King's Ransom it is revealed that he may be alive and still a Vesper. This theory is later disproved. The fire was started by Isabel Kabra. He is not a Madrigal, but was one of the most active people in the Madrigals. His card is No. 246.

Hilary Vale
Hilary Vale (from Massachusetts) is Grace Cahill's best friend. She is also Theo Cotter's grandmother. In the fourth book, she saves Amy and Dan Cahill from the Ekats. She also gives Amy and Dan the third Sakhet. Later, she tries to steal the third Sakhet from the children.

Theo Cotter
Theo Cotter is Hilary Vale's grandson. He is an archaeologist and Egyptologist who saved Amy and Dan Cahill from a trap. He helped them recover the third Sakhet in the fourth book. However, he tried to steal it from them later with his aunt. Due to guilt, he sent Irina Spasky away from the children.

Sami Kamel
Sami Kamel (from Cairo, Egypt) is the store owner of Treasures of Egypt. In the fourth book, his store secretly hides the Clue which Amy and Dan Cahill found.

Shep Trent
Shepard "Shep" Trent (from Sydney, Australia) is a professional pilot and surfer. He is Arthur Trent's best friend and cousin. He helped Amy and Dan Cahill escape Isabel Kabra and flies them to Coober Pedy.

Winifred Thembeka
Winifred Thembeka (from Johannesburg, South Africa) is one of Grace Cahill's friends. She is a librarian. In the seventh book, she gives Amy and Dan Cahill access to some of their grandmother Grace Cahill's belongings and photos.

Lester Dixon
Lester Dixon (from Spanish Town, Jamaica) is one of Grace Cahill's friends. He is an archaeologist. Although he helped Amy and Dan Cahill throughout the book, he abandons them amidst their confrontation of Isabel Kabra. He drowns on quicksand after trying to help Anton and Hugo Aguelles, Isabel's bodyguards; and is later pulled by policemen from the water. He dies after drowning in quicksand.

The Aguelles Siblings
Anton and Hugo Aguelles (from Kingston, Jamaica) are Isabel Kabra's ginormous bodyguards. They were only present in the ninth book, where they had caused much havoc to Amy and Dan Cahill. During an escape, the Aguelles were trapped on quicksand. Lester Dixon helped them, but instead the siblings used Lester as a ladder and led him to his death.

Introduced in Cahills vs Vespers

The Council of Six 
The Council of Six was the leading body in the Vesper hierarchy. Within the council, Vesper 1 held the most power while Vesper 6 held the least. Sinead Starling and Isabel Kabra were both introduced in the previous series, but appeared in Cahills vs Vespers as different characters.

Vesper Six-The Enforcer
Revealed to be Cheyenne Wyoming. The daughter of two imprisoned criminals, Cheyenne worked her way up to the Vesper's Council of Six. In Day of Doom, she was arrested by local authorities and tied to various other crimes.

Vesper Five-The Spymaster
Revealed to be Luna Amato. In The Dead of Night, she was shot by Jonah Wizard.

Vesper Four-The Scientist
Revealed to be Sandy Bancroft. A weatherman, he was arrested by local authorities after the destruction of the Doomsday Device. It was revealed that his credentials were fake.

Vesper Three-The Mole
Revealed to be Sinead Starling. She fell in love with Riley McGrath, who presented the Vespers to her as good people. When she eventually joined, it was in part to help find a cure for her brothers. She framed Ian for her crimes, then turned and betrayed the Vespers. Despite Amy offering forgiveness, she fled, ending up in Singapore and eventually Havana.

Vesper Two-The Shield
Revealed to be Isabel Kabra. A daughter of Vesper parents, it is unknown if Isabel was ever loyal to the Cahills and if the Vespers were simply a get-out-of-jail-free card. She died fighting the Vespers, helping the Cahills destroy the Doomsday Machine.

Vesper One-The Mastermind
Revealed to be Damian Vesper, also known as Riley McGrath and Dave Spimer. He is a direct descendant of the first Damien Vesper. As Riley, he began a romantic relationship with Sinead Starling, convincing her to betray the Cahills. As Dave, he killed Astrid Rosenbloom in an attempt to destroy the Guardians.

Evan Tolliver 
Evan Tolliver (from Attleboro, Massachusetts) was the boyfriend of Amy Cahill and a Cahill ally. During the events of Cahills vs Vespers, he helped Ian Kabra and Sinead Starling run the command center. He discovered Sinead was the mole. He was shot in Day of Doom.

Jake Rosenbloom 
Jake Rosenbloom is the son of archaeologist Mark Rosenbloom and the boyfriend of Amy Cahill. Jake speaks many languages and has traveled extensively. He has studied the Voynich manuscript.

Atticus Rosenbloom 
Atticus Rosenbloom is child genius with a field of interest in ancient languages. At only eleven, he's on par with the most knowledgeable adults in the world.

Erasmus 
Erasmus (originally from Turkey) is a Cahill of mysterious origins. He was brought in by Fiske to help the Cahills defeat the Vespers. He rides a motorcycle, and is experienced in hand-to-hand combat and firearms. He died in The Dead of Night at the hands of Luna Amato, then was avenged by Jonah Wizard.

Sammy Mourad 
Sammy Mourad (originally from Egypt) is a Lucian-Ekat scientist. Studying at a university in New England, he was approached by Dan Cahill to create the master serum. He did, but began his own research into making the serum safe for consumption. He quickly stopped, realizing the work was wrong. Thinking J. Rutherford Pierce was Fiske Cahill, he gave away his research, allowing Pierce to mass-produce it. He was kidnapped by Pierce to help oversee the production, but along with Nellie Gomez, he destroyed the lab thus halting production. He is in a relationship with Nellie.

Introduced in Unstoppable

The Pierce Family

J. Rutherford Pierce 
Introduced to the world of the Cahills through Hope, Pierce took his opportunity to achieve greatness when he discovered there existed a completed version of the master serum that was safe to consume. On his quest to rule the world, he started with expanding his media outlet, Founders Media. He then entered the race for President, with the plan of detonating six small nuclear bombs and starting a third world war. In the chaos, he would emerge as a savior and slowly become the world's leader. His plan was stopped by Amy and Dan Cahill and friends when they infiltrated his clam bake, destroyed his stores of the serum, gave him and his men the antidote, and showed him abusing his wife on television. It was stated that he is now a joke.

Cara Pierce 
The daughter and eldest child of J. Rutherford Pierce. She's an overachiever, and wants to please her father. She operates under the hacker alias AprilMay, and found herself in the employment of her father who did not know her true identity. She discovered his plans, and turned to the Cahill's side, helping them defeat Pierce. As Cara, she was given modified doses of the serum. Pierce promised her that she would be his heir, then disowned her when she betrayed him. She plays violin, and is in a romantic relationship with Ian Kabra.

Galt Pierce 
The son of J. Rutherford Pierce. It was always assumed that he would be Pierce's heir, taking over his company and his power. He was enraged when Cara began getting Pierce's favor, and ruthlessly tried to stop the Cahills.

Debbie-Anne Pierce 
Pierce's wife. He never loved her, still wished he'd ended up with Hope Cahill. She's a Starling by birth, and is Sinead's aunt. She played a small role in his downfall. It was revealed that they divorced, and she received a lot of money.

Pony 
A digital cowboy. Nellie hired him after discovering that they Cahills had been hacked. He died at the end of Countdown.

Introduced in Doublecross

Nathaniel Hartford 
Nathaniel Hartford (from Cambridge, Massachusetts) was the husband of Grace Cahill. He was killed by Vladimir Spasky while in Moscow, since he was looking for revenge from Isabel Kabra for killing his daughter, Hope Cahill. He is an Ekat. In Doublecross, he is revealed to be the Outcast, the series’ main antagonist. It was also revealed that Grace Cahill assigned Lucian assassin Vladimir Spasky to kill Hartford; however, Spasky let him live. Hartford was killed in Mission Atomic when his own mutant bees turn on him in "The Hive". He does not have a card.

Magnus Hansen 
The leader of the Tomas. Hansen turned to Hartford's side in an effort to dispose of Ian Kabra.

Patricia Oh 
The leader of the Ekats. She turned to Hartford's side in an effort to dispose of Ian Kabra.

Founders

Gideon Cahill
Gideon Cahill (from Cahill Island, Ireland) is the father of the founders of the five branches. He was one of the smartest scientists in Ireland in his time, having discovered how to turn lead into gold. This was the reason that the townsfolk asked for his help to create a cure for the plague. However, in his efforts to find a cure, he discovered a serum that would enhance an individual's abilities in every kind of human endeavor, but it killed him from inside. Thus, he gave each of his children a part of the formula for safe guarding, improving their skills. Then he destroyed his research and died on the way. The children wanted the whole serum, and consequently continued to fight for it until the reunification caused by Amy and Dan Cahill's efforts. He died in a house fire caused by the Vesper family. He does not have a card. He had a ring that is very important and powerful – the Vespers hunt for it.

Olivia Cahill
Olivia Cahill (from Cahill Island, Ireland) is the mother of the five Cahill children and the supportive wife of Gideon Cahill. After Gideon's death, her children began on going their separate ways and created their own branches to compete with each other for the serum's powers. She inherited the ring as a token of love from Gideon after he died. She does not have a card.

Luke Cahill
Luke Cahill (from Cahill Island, Ireland) is the founder of the Lucians. He is the brother of Thomas, Katherine, Jane, and Madeleine. He is fond of poison and daggers, wherein Sir Isaac Newton found one of his swords. His branch originally settled in London, where he served as one of the advisors of King Henry VII, and continued to spread worldwide. This is proved by the diary which he gave to Jane, which is what she witnessed. He received the power of great violence and secrecy through the serum. His official card is No. 115.

Katherine Cahill
Katherine Cahill (from Cahill Island, Ireland) is the founder of the Ekats.  She is the sister of Thomas, Luke, Jane and Madeleine Cahill. She is fond of technology and science. She has a deep abhorrence with Thomas that she managed to steal one of his clues. Her branch originally settled in Cairo, and continued to spread worldwide. She received the power of great knowledge and creativity through the serum. Her official card is No. 99.

Thomas Cahill
Thomas Cahill (from Cahill Island, Ireland) is the founder of the Tomas. He is the brother of Luke, Katherine, Jane, and Madeleine. He likes sports and games, as well as traveling. He has a high disgust with Katherine Cahill due to Katherine stealing one of his clues. His branch originally settled in Tokyo, and continued to spread worldwide. He received the power of great strength and agility through the serum. His official card is No. 124.

Jane Cahill
Jane Cahill (from Cahill Island, Ireland) is the founder of the Janus. She is the sister of Thomas, Luke, Katherine, and Madeleine. She is good at writing and painting, as well as at music. It is said that she knew who caused the fire. Her branch originally settled in Venice, and continued to spread worldwide. She received the power of great talents and skills through the serum. Her official card is No. 82.

Madeleine Cahill
Madeleine Cahill (from Cahill Island, Ireland) is the founder of the Madrigals. She is the sister of Thomas, Luke, Jane and Katherine.
After the fire, Thomas, Luke, Jane, and Katherine went and founded the branches. They left their mother behind, not knowing that she was pregnant with their sister. Olivia raised Madeleine alone, stressing her desire for the branches to unite. Madeleine is rumored to have some dealings with the Vespers concerning Olivia's death, which suggests she knew who started the fire.

Damien Vesper
Damien Vesper is the founder of the Vesper Organization. A wealthy nobleman, he was friends with Gideon Cahill. Over time, he grew jealous of Gideon's success, wanting Gideon's research and discoveries for himself. When Gideon refused to share, Damien killed him and burnt down his house. He was not successful in getting the master serum. His descendants, the Vespers, have been enemies of the Cahills ever since.

Minor Card characters

Victor Wood
Victor Wood (from London, United Kingdom) is a chemist of the Ekats. He is researching on a Clue under Dr. Lee. He was also sent to Easter Island to spy the headquarters of Madrigals. His card is No. 23.

Gordon Klose
Gordon L. Klose (from Tbilisi, Georgia) is a Lucian agent of Section 7 of the Government of the United States. He is apparently spying on Grace Cahill. His card is No. 39.

Alana Flores
Alana Flores (from Los Angeles, USA) was a chess prodigy of the Lucians. Her request to accompany The Kabras on the hunt was rejected by the branch due to her obvious ruthlessness. Also, she was sent to Easter Island to spy the headquarters of Madrigals. Her card is No. 40. She is one of the only Lucians who is not afraid of Isabel Kabra.

Heinrich Heinrichson
Heinrich Heinrichson (from Berlin, Germany) is an escaped prisoner of the Tomas. He is spying on William McIntyre. His card is No. 50.

Yasmeen Badawi
Yasmeen Badawi (from Maadi, Egypt) is a robotic inventor of the Ekats. She was hired by Bae Oh to invent robots to be sent for Clue search in Anak Krakatoa, Indonesia. Her card is No. 97.

Sophie Watson
Sophie Watson (from London, United Kingdom) is a Janus dancer. She is competing with Natalie Kabra on a Clue in her hometown. Her card is No. 151.

Devin Cooper
Devin Cooper (from Evanston, Illinois) is an Ekat treehouse engineer. He is building several booby-traps for the Ekat's safe-keeping of the Rosetta Stone in England. His card is No. 167.

Teodora Kosara
Teodora Kosara (from Sofia, Bulgaria) is an Ekat. She is looking for Clues everywhere in the world by sabotaging other people around her. In the Black Book of Buried Secrets, it is proved she has ties with the Vespers. in Rapid Fire 5 she appeared as a skydiving teacher and trained Amy into skydiving. Then she pointed Amy with a gun and asked, "Where's the ring?" (Gideon's Ring). Amy escapes. Her card is No. 169.

Andras Gergely
Andras Gergely (from Budapest, Hungary) is a Lucian. He is planning to conquer all branches with his branch. His card is No. 179.

Maleia Kalani
Maleia Kalani (from Honolulu, Hawaii) is a Tomas surfer. She was sent to Easter Island to spy the headquarters of Madrigals. Her card is No. 189.

Mission characters

Mission 0: Agent Training 

Grace Cahill: See Grace Cahill.
William McIntyre: See William McIntyre.

Mission 1: The Lost Clue 

Anne Cahill (from Drumnadrochit, United Kingdom) is an Ekat passenger of RMS Titanic. She was sent from Scotland to US to transport a Clue, only to almost perish on the ship. She stayed at Experiment, US to hide her identity and to keep Clue hunters away from the Clue. She has no card.
George McClain (from Experiment, Georgia) is a Tomas funeral director. He is looking for the Clue in Mission 1 after having suspicions unto Anne Cahill. His card is No. 5.
Paul Addison (from Drumnadrochit, United Kingdom) is a Tomas resident. He is spying on Charlie Wallace and the Loch Ness Monster, and tries to prove that the monster is only a hoax. His card is No. 49.
Charlie Wallace (from Drumnadrochit, United Kingdom) is an Ekat resident. He owns the souvenir shop Nessie Shack, and tries to prove to everyone that the Loch Ness Monster is real. In reality, he is protecting the Clue in Mission 1 with a submarine designed to act like the Loch Ness Monster. He does not have a card.

Mission 3: The Lost Diamond 

Maria Marapao (from Manila, Philippines) is a Janus eskrimador. She is looking for the clue in Mission 3. Her card is No. 7.
Jonah Wizard: See Team Six: The Wizards.
Lilya Chernova (from St. Petersburg, Russia) is an Ekat socialite. Her family is disguising a piece of the Tavernier Blue into a necklace and keeps it in a family safe. Her card is No. 24.

Mission 4: The Lucian Fort 

Ian Kabra: For information, see Team One: The Kabras.
Natalie Kabra: For information, see Team One: The Kabras.
Chrissy Collins (from Frankfort, Kentucky) is a Lucian cheerleader. She was almost caught by the police for breaking into Fort Knox. Her card is No. 113.

Mission 5: The General's Clue 

Alistair Oh: See Team Three: Alistair Oh.
Jonah Wizard: See Team Six: The Wizards.
Mateo Sanchez (from Bogota, Colombia) is a Tomas football player. He is protecting the Clue in Mission 5. His card is No. 122.

Mission 6: The Mad Scientist's Clue 

Leslie Mill (from Los Angeles, US) is a Janus director. He is directing a film about the Clue in Mission 6 after being told so by Cora Wizard. His card is No. 81.
Jonah Wizard: See Team Six: The Wizards.
Reagan Holt: See Team Two: The Holts.

Mission 7: The Frozen Secret 

Alistair Oh: See Team Three: Alistair Oh.

Mission 8: The Desert Sabotage 

Ian Kabra: See Team One: The Kabras.

Non-Fictional Cahills 
The following are historical or public figures mentioned in either the books, cards, or the online game as members of the Cahill family.

Lucians 
Isaac Newton  was an English physicist, mathematician, astronomer, natural philosopher, alchemist, and theologian. His Philosophiæ Naturalis Principia Mathematica (Latin for "Mathematical Principles of Natural Philosophy"; usually called the Principia), published in 1687, is one of the most important scientific books ever written.  It lays the groundwork for most of classical mechanics. In this work, Newton described universal gravitation and the three laws of motion, which dominated the scientific view of the physical universe for the next three centuries. Newton showed that the motions of objects on Earth and of celestial bodies are governed by the same set of natural laws, by demonstrating the consistency between Kepler's laws of planetary motion and his theory of gravitation; thus removing the last doubts about heliocentrism and advancing the Scientific Revolution.
Edmond Halley:  was an English astronomer, geophysicist, mathematician, meteorologist, and physicist who is best known for computing the orbit of the eponymous Halley's comet. He was the second Astronomer Royal in Britain, following in the footsteps of John Flamsteed.
Napoleon I, (from Ajaccio, France) is an influential political leader and emperor. In the fourth book, during his Egyptian expedition, he finds the first Sakhet among his Rosetta Stone discovery. Shortly after, he commands Bernardino Drovetti to deliver the Sakhet in France. In Mission 5, he sends a secret letter to King Ferdinard of Spain, telling him to take action against Tomas Simon Boliviar. His card is No. 180.
Winston Churchill (from Oxfordshire, United Kingdom) is an influential political leader. In the seventh book, it was revealed that he was related to Shaka Zulu, one of the most superior Tomas of all time.
Bernardino Drovetti (from Barbania, Italy) is a diplomat, explorer, antiquitarian, and lawyer. In the fourth book, it is revealed that he secretly hid the first Sekhmet in France as told by Napoleon I.
Benjamin Franklin (from Boston, USA) is an influential author, politician, scientist, inventor, statesman, soldier, and diplomat. In the first book, while commissioned by the United States to Paris, he hid a Clue located under the Paris Catacombs. It started the rivalry between him and his own branch. He has no official card.
Alexei Nikolaevich, (from Petergof, Russia) is the last heir apparent or Tsesarevich of Russia. He is the brother of Anastasia Nikolaevna Romanov. From him, the Royal Hemophilia Line continued and was passed on Nataliya Ruslanova Radova. Also in the fifth book, his bedroom served as a location for the next way to Nataliya. He has no cards.
Anastasia Romanov, (from Petergof, Russia) is the youngest daughter of Nicholas II of Russia, the last sovereign of Imperial Russia. She is Nataliya Ruslanova Radova's mother. According to the fifth book, she was a good friend of Grace Cahill, and was the only one who escaped the murder of her family by the Bolshevik forces. Her official card is No. 94.
Grigori Rasputin (from Pokrovskoye, Russia) is a starets. He is possibly Nataliya Ruslanova Radova's biological father. In the fifth book, his murder site, the Yusupov Palace, provided the next way for Amy and Dan Cahill to find NRR. He has no respective cards.
Gustave Eiffel was a French structural engineer from the École Centrale Paris, an architect, an entrepreneur and a specialist of metallic structures. He is acclaimed for designing the world-famous Eiffel Tower, built 1887–1889 for the 1889 Universal Exposition in Paris, France.  Notable among his other works is the armature for the Statue of Liberty, New York Harbor, United States.
Sidney Reilly , famously known as the Ace of Spies, was a Jewish Russian-born adventurer and secret agent employed by Scotland Yard, the British Secret Service Bureau and later the Secret Intelligence Service (SIS). He is alleged to have spied for at least four nations. His notoriety during the 1920s was created in part by his friend, British diplomat and journalist Sir Robert Bruce Lockhart, who sensationalised their thwarted operation to overthrow the Bolshevik government in 1918.
Ching Shih
William Stoughton
Grand Duke Konstantin Pavlovich of Russia
Gavrilo Princip
Catherine the Great
Theodore Roosevelt
Queen Victoria
Aaron Burr

Ekaterinas 
Dr. von Gudden was a German neuroanatomist and psychiatrist born in Kleve. He was appointed personal physician to King Ludwig II of Bavaria. On 13 June 1886, Ludwig and Gudden were both found dead in the water near the shore of Lake Starnberg at 11:30 p.m., allegedly drowned, possibly murdered. To this day the details of their deaths remain a mystery.
Howard Carter (from Kensington, United Kingdom) is an archaeologist and Egyptologist. He discovered one of the three Sakhets while searching for the tomb of King Tutankhamun; which contains part of the map of Nefertari's tomb in the fourth book. He has no respective card.
Marie Curie was a Polish-born French physicist and chemist famous for her work on radioactivity. She was a pioneer in the field of radioactivity and the first person honored with two Nobel Prizes—in physics and chemistry. She was also the first female professor at the University of Paris.
John Flamsteed  was an English astronomer and the first Astronomer Royal. He catalogued over 3000 stars.
Eli Whitney
Thomas Edison
Nikola Tesla
Albert Einstein
T. E. Lawrence
Orville Wright
Wilbur Wright
Abraham Lincoln
Alexander Hamilton

Tomas 
Toyotomi Hideyoshi (from Nagoya, Japan) is an influential daimyō and warrior. He was the son of Thomas Cahill. In the third book, while invading South Korea, he hid his treasure at the Bukhansan, which was really a Clue. He does not have a card.
Shaka Zulu Shaka kaSenzangakhona, also known as Shaka Zulu (from Melmoth, South Africa) is an influential leader of the Zulu Kingdom. In the seventh book, the Clue was placed beside his grave to commemorate his superiority at his branch. His official card is No. 146.
George Mallory was a British teacher and mountaineer. He died on Mount Everest when he tried to hide a Clue.
David Livingstone was a Scottish Congregationalist pioneer medical missionary with the London Missionary Society and explorer in Africa. His meeting with H. M. Stanley gave rise to the popular quotation, "Dr. Livingstone, I presume?".
Jean-Baptiste Tavernier
Gertrude Ederle
Annie Oakley
Paul Addison
Lakshmi Mittal
George Washington
John Franklin
Meriwether Lewis
William Clark
Sacagawea
Neil Armstrong
Simón Bolívar
Ulysses S. Grant
Dwight D. Eisenhower
Marie Marvingt
Louis XIV of France
The 1st Duke of Wellington

Janus 
Emperor Shah Jahan (from Lahore, Pakistan) is an influential emperor. He built the Taj Mahal for his wife Mumtaz Mahal. Cahills had thought that Shah Jahan was behind of hiding the Clue in Mission 2.
Ustad Ahmad Lahauri (from Lahore, Pakistan) is a famous architect. During the construction of Taj Mahal, he was assigned to hide a Clue in one of his fortresses. He chose the Red Fort, specifically the Diwan-i-Khas, as the location of the Clue in Mission 2.
King Ludwig (Ludwig Otto Friedrich Wilhelm; sometimes rendered as Louis II in English) was King of Bavaria from 1864 until shortly before his death.  He is sometimes called the Swan King (English) and der Märchenkönig, the Fairy tale King, (German). Ludwig is sometimes also called "Mad King Ludwig", though the accuracy of that label has been disputed. Additional titles were Count Palatine of the Rhine, Duke of Bavaria, Franconia and in Swabia.
Thomas Jefferson was the third President of the United States (1801–1809) and the principal author of the Declaration of Independence (1776). An influential Founding Father, Jefferson envisioned America as a great "Empire of Liberty" that would promote republicanism.
Nannerl Mozart (from Salzburg, Austria) was a musician. After her death, her diary was kept inside a library in Vienna because of its significant value. It also provides information of his brother's acquisition of Japanese steel, which was actually a hint to the Clue in both the second book and the third book. She has no card.
Wolfgang Amadeus Mozart (from Salzburg, Austria) is an influential composer of the Classical Era. He inserted his musical piece "The Place Where I Born" inside another of his compositions to provide hint to the Clue in the second book. He also acquired Japanese steel from Fidelio Racco to serve as a Clue in both the second book and The Sword Thief He has no official card.
Mary Shelley: (née Mary Wollstonecraft Godwin) was a British novelist, short story writer, dramatist, essayist, biographer, and travel writer, best known for her Gothic novel Frankenstein: or, The Modern Prometheus (1818). She also edited and promoted the works of her husband, the Romantic poet and philosopher Percy Bysshe Shelley. Her father was the political philosopher William Godwin, and her mother was the philosopher and feminist Mary Wollstonecraft.
Percy Bysshe Shelley: The husband of Mary Shelley
Raoul Lufbery was a French-American fighter pilot and flying ace in World War I.  Because he served in both French aviation, and later the United States Army Air Service in World War I, he is sometimes listed as a French ace and sometimes as an American ace, though all but one of his 17 combat victories came while flying in French units. He was famous for having a pet lion.
Harry Houdini was a Hungarian-born American magician and escapologist, stunt performer, actor and film producer noted for his sensational escape acts. He was also a skeptic who set out to expose frauds purporting to be supernatural phenomena.
Mark Twain was an author. It is revealed in Book 6 that he was almost killed by Robert Cahill Henderson/Bob Troppo.
Lord Byron
Emperor Puyi was a child emperor and the last Emperor of China. In Book 8 it was revealed that he hid the clue, Silk on top of Mount Everest with the help of Tomas George Mallory.
Beethoven
Alessandro Cagliostro
Henry Morton Stanley
Jane Austen
Vincent van Gogh
Maximilian I of Mexico
Ambrose Bierce
Walter Raleigh
Josephine Baker
Archduke Franz Ferdinand of Austria

Madrigal 
Anne Bonny disguised herself as a man to travel for the clue hunt. She owns a locket with the photo of Madeleine Cahill.
Deng Xiaoping 
Amelia Earhart is a pilot. In Book 6 it is revealed that she was searching for Bob Troppo.
William Shakespeare is Madeleine's grandson. He was the most powerful agent in the branch. However, when his children was born he became an inactive agent. He includes some clues in his plays.
Mother Teresa
Florence Nightingale became an active Madrigal because of treating people that are injured from war.
Abigail Adams is the wife of non-Cahill second president of United States, John Adams.
Dolley Madison had to hide a map to a ring from the Vespers.
Harriet Tubman
Frederick Douglass
Nanny of the Maroons
Walt Whitman
Franklin D. Roosevelt
Eleanor Roosevelt

References 

Characters
Lists of literary characters